Brookland, also known as Little Rome, is a neighborhood located in the Northeast (NE) quadrant of Washington, D.C. It is best known for its numerous Catholic institutions, including schools, religious communities, shrines, institutes, and other organizations built and based around the Catholic University of America.

Historically centered along 12th Street NE, Brookland is bounded by Taylor Street NE and Michigan Avenue NE to the northwest; by Rhode Island Avenue NE to the southeast; by South Dakota Avenue NE to the northeast; and by subway (Washington Metro's Red Line) and train (CSX) tracks to the west. 

The western boundary of the railroad tracks originated with the completion of the former Metropolitan Branch of the Baltimore and Ohio Railroad in 1873, which now incorporates the Washington Metro's Red Line. Brookland’s boundaries stretches to the national shrine and includes catholic university.

The Washington Metropolitan Area Transit Authority (WMATA) provides public transportation services to and throughout Brookland, with two subway stations and several bus lines. Most of the Brookland neighborhood is served by the Washington Metropolitan Area Red Line Brookland–CUA Metro station, located between Monroe Street NE and Michigan Avenue NE. A small portion of the Brookland neighborhood located on Rhode Island Avenue NE is served by the Red Line Rhode Island Avenue Metro Station.

History 

In 1632 the English Crown unilaterally took the land from the Piscataway Natives who inhabited the Potomac-Anacostia region. King Charles I of England in turn granted the land, which was to become the state of Maryland, to George Calvert, whose interest in the colony lay in "the sacred duty of finding a refuge for his Roman Catholic brethren." It took until about 1675 for English settlers to reach what is now the DC area, after defeating the Powhatans in 1645 by spreading diseases that reduced the Native American numbers by roughly 90 percent. 

Colonel Jehiel Brooks married into the land when he married Ann Margaret Queen, daughter of Nicholas Queen, and they received a 150-acre estate.  In 1722, the Queen Family raised a Roman Catholic Church, which morphed into St. Francis de Sales Parish in 1908.

For most of the 19th century the area was farmland owned by the prominent Middleton and Queen families. The Baltimore and Ohio Railroad later connected this portion of Washington County to downtown. Bellair, the 1840 brick Greek Revival mansion built by Colonel Jehiel Brooks, still stands. It is referred to as Brooks Mansion. It is the site of offices and production facilities for the Public Access Corporation of the District of Columbia, the city's Government-access television (GAVT) channel known as DCTV.

Change came rapidly during and after the American Civil War. First, Fort Slemmer and Fort Bunker Hill were constructed as defenses against the Confederate Army, and later the Old Soldiers' Home was constructed to the northwest. The population of the city itself increased with the expansion of the federal government, and the former Brooks family estate became a housing tract named "Brookland."

Growth continued throughout the 1870s when the Baltimore and Ohio Railroad opened its Western Branch Line in the developing Brookland neighborhood. With the construction of nearby Sherwood, University Heights, and other tracts and with the expansion of Washington's streetcar system, a middle-class streetcar suburb developed. Eventually its expansion southward met Washington's northward expansion. Many Queen Anne style and other Victorian homes still stand.

The transition from a country estate towards a residential development beginning in 1887 "marked the extension of suburban growth into the rather isolated reaches of the northeastern sector" of D.C. In its early days, the Brookland community was marked by "spacious lots and single family homes" which appealed to middle-class families and provided a "small town atmosphere."

Education 

 Brookland Middle School
 Brookland Violin Studio
 Bunker Hill Elementary School
 Capital Village Public Charter School
 Catholic University of America
 Champions at Edgewood Elementary Campus
 DC Prep PCS Edgewood Elementary School
 DC Prep PCS Edgewood Middle Campus
 John Burroughs Elementary School - DC Public School
 Latin American Montessori Bilingual Public Charter School (LAMB)
 Lee Montessori Public Charter Schools
 The Sojourner Truth School
 St. Anthony Catholic School
 Saint Vincents Home and School for Girls
 Shining Stars Montessori Academy

Landmarks 

 Fort Bunker Hill
 Newton Theater
 Dahlgreen Courts
 Brooks Mansion & DCTV (TV station)
 Ralph Bunche House
 Quincy House
 Charles Richard Drew Memorial Bridge
 Bunker Hill Elementary School 
 Brookland Middle School 
 Elsie Whitlow Stokes Public Charter School
 Shining Stars Montessori Public Charter School 
Luke C. Moore SHS 
 Hope Community Public Charter School, Tolson Campus 
 Mary McLeod Bethune Day Academy Public Charter School 
 Franciscan Monastery  and the St. Francis Hall 
 Benjamin Mays Hall (formerly, College of the Holy Name) 
 Turkey Thicket playground and recreation center 
 St. Anthony's Catholic School & Church
 King David Masonic Lodge 
 The Round House

Catholic institutions 

Brookland, together with its surrounding neighborhoods, has been at times referred to as Little Rome because of the many Catholic organizations and institutions clustered around the Catholic University of America. The university itself does not lie within Brookland's borders, but since the Catholic Church purchased the Middletown estate  adjacent to Brookland in 1887, many Catholic groups have established themselves there and in the neighboring communities of Edgewood and Michigan Park. Ordered by year of establishment, major Catholic organizations that are physically located in Brookland include:

 Franciscan Monastery of the Holy Land in America (1905) and St. Francis Hall (1931)
 Holy Name College (1931–1984)
 Poor Clares of Perpetual Adoration Convent (1954–2017), Sisters of Life Convent (2017–present)
 Archdiocese for the Military Services, USA (1986)

From 1984 until 2015, the Franciscans’ Holy Name College had served as the Howard University School of Divinity's East Campus. As a divinity school, the institution did not solely focus on Christianity. Rather, it sought to educate students in scripture and theology generally, and to prepare them to be academics or to be ordained to serve as clergy. In 2016, the Urban Land Institute studied the site and engaged community stakeholders to determine potential development that might take place at the location. As of 2017, the site is scheduled to be redeveloped into a living-learning campus with current historic structures and open space preserved.

Community diversity 

Brookland integrated in the 20th century, especially after white flight took place following World War II and the US Supreme Court ruled in 1948 that restrictive covenants were unenforceable . Although there was some hostility directed at early black integration of the neighborhood, by the 1970s Brookland had developed into a neighborhood fairly integrated among economic classes and races.

During the mid-twentieth century, Brookland could boast of such prominent residents as Ralph Bunche, Sterling Allen Brown, Edward Brooke, Ellis O. Knox, Rayford W. Logan, Pearl Bailey, John P. Davis, Marvin Gaye, Paul Tsongas, Lucy Diggs Slowe, Lois Mailou Jones, and Robert C. Weaver. It remains a relatively diverse and stable area of Washington. African American architect Romulus C. Archer designed homes, buildings, and churches in the area.

Brookland was also home to the playwright Jean Kerr and her playwright/critic husband Walter Kerr, who taught at nearby CUA. The writer Marjorie Kinnan Rawlings spent her childhood in Brookland.

Justine Ward, the music educator and author, lived in Brookland and built the large residence now occupied by the Servants of the Lord and the Virgin of Matara  in the 1300 block of Quincy Street. CUA's School of Music is named in Ward's honor. Also on Quincy Street is the Quincy House, a long-time residence of Catholic graduate students who regularly host coffee houses and other community events.

Businesses
Brookland Hardware anchored 12th Street NE for many years until it closed in November 2015; for hardware, locals either go to Annie's Ace Hardware about five blocks to the west, in Edgewood on the other side of the Red Line, or to Home Depot just south of Rhode Island Avenue. However, many full-service restaurants still make the thoroughfare a bustling corridor. These include: Brookland's Finest, Menomale, San Antonio Grill, Masala Story , Primrose (aka Larry's Chicken and Cheeseburgers)   and Murray and Paul's, which is only open for breakfast. New additions in 2016 included Pho12  and Salumeria Italiana, an Italian deli from the owners of Menomale. Additionally, there are also a few carry-out restaurants including Today's Pizza, Pizza Boli's, and Sammy Carry-Out. Other businesses found along 12th street include Yes! Organic Market, Good Food Market , Openbox9 Graphic Design Studio, along with realtors, auto-mechanics, a 7-Eleven, nail and hair salons, florists, dry cleaners, and liquor stores. District Veterinary Hospital is located on 10th Street. Right Proper Brewery's Production House & Tasting Room is also located in the neighborhood. Tastemakers, a commercial kitchen for small, local food businesses and a food hall open to the public is also located in the Brookland neighborhood.

In November 2011, D.C. based real estate developer Abdo broke ground on a large mixed-use development spread over a previously underutilized 8.9-acre plot. The project, known as Monroe Street Market, was fully completed in 2014. Despite the word "BROOKLAND" prominently painted on the main building, the entire complex lies within neighboring Edgewood. This area includes 27 artists' studios on an "Arts Walk," a Barnes & Noble (CUA's bookstore), a Potbelly Sandwich Works, a Chipotle Mexican Grill, a Starbucks, and local chain Busboys and Poets. While there are new projects slated for 2017/2018, at least part of the community believes the area is being overly developed, which has led to a few court battles with developers. A nearly-full-block parcel on Monroe Street between 9th and 10th Streets, the site of Colonel Brooks' Tavern until 2012, remains vacant at this time because of conflicts between neighbors and developers over the height of the planned mixed-use complex, meant to include over 200 apartments.

See also

 Washington, D.C.
 Neighborhoods in Washington, D.C.
 History of Washington, D.C.

References

External links 

 Brookland Neighborhood Civic Association
 BygoneBrookland (Brookland History)
 2011 Washington Post article on Brookland
 The Brooks - Queen Family Collection (1773-1979) documents the activities of members of the two families who built the Brooks Mansion.
 Door to Door interview with author of Images of America: Brookland
 Map of Brookland in 1903

 
Streetcar suburbs
Catholic University of America
Neighborhoods in Northeast (Washington, D.C.)